White Bluff, also known as Ecor Blanc, is a historic site located along the Tombigbee River in Demopolis, Alabama. It is a chalk cliff, roughly one mile long, that is composed of a geological layer known as the Demopolis Chalk Formation, part of the Selma Group.

White Bluff was first named Ecor Blanc by 18th century French explorers and map makers. It also became known as the Chickasaw Gallery because early Native American inhabitants harnessed their boats at the foot of the cliff.  It was the site where French Bonapartist refugees landed in 1817 and established their Vine and Olive Colony.  White Bluff is the site for the main event of the annual Christmas on the River festival.

References

National Register of Historic Places in Marengo County, Alabama
Demopolis, Alabama
Tombigbee River
Landforms of Marengo County, Alabama
Natural features on the National Register of Historic Places
Cliffs of the United States